The 2020–21 FC Midtjylland season was FC Midtjylland's 22nd season of existence, and their 20th consecutive season in the Danish Superliga, the top tier of football in Denmark. As a result of the club's league title in 2019–20, it qualified for the 2020–21 UEFA Champions League, advancing to the Group Stage and vied for the 2020–21 Danish Cup, losing in the semi-finals.

Squad

Out on loan

Transfers

Arrivals

Summer

Winter

Departures

Summer

Winter

Non-competitive

Pre-season friendlies

Mid-season friendlies

Competitive

Competition record

Danish Superliga

Regular season

Championship round

Regular season

Championship round

Danish Cup

UEFA Champions League

Qualifying round and Play-off round

Group stage

Group D

Statistics

Appearances 

Includes all competitive matches.

Goalscorers 

This includes all competitive matches.

Assists 

This includes all competitive matches.

Clean sheets 

This includes all competitive matches.

Disciplinary record 

This includes all competitive matches.

References

External links 
 FC Midtjylland  in Danish

FC Midtjylland seasons
Danish football clubs 2020–21 season
Midtjylland